Frachon is a surname. Notable people with the surname include:

Alain Frachon (born 1950), French journalist 
Benoît Frachon (1893–1975), French metalworker and trade union leader 
Mathilde Julia Frachon (born 1992), French fashion model

French-language surnames